DWGT-TV (channel 4) is a television station in Metro Manila, Philippines, serving as the flagship of the government-owned People's Television Network. The station maintains studios and hybrid analog/digital transmitting facility at Broadcast Complex, Visayas Avenue, Brgy. Vasra, Diliman, Quezon City.

History
In 1961, the Philippine government, through the Philippine Broadcasting Service established a government TV station called DZFM-TV Channel 10 which it time-shared with two other organizations. It was financed by government subsidy but had a short life because of channel frequency allocation.

The frequency rights of Channel 4 were previously owned by one of the ABS-CBN stations in Metro Manila (DZXL-TV 4) when the station moved from channel 9 to channel 4 on November 14, 1969.

During the Martial Law era, the government seized the frequency of channel 4 of ABS-CBN, reopened it by the National Media Production Center on February 2, 1974, as Government Television (GTV). GTV was located at the former ABS-CBN Broadcasting Center complex on Bohol (now Sgt. Esguerra) Avenue, Quezon City, which was renamed Broadcast Plaza. In 1978, it began broadcasting in full color — becoming the last national network that transitioned from the then existing monochrome to color broadcasting.  By 1980, GTV became MBS (Maharlika Broadcasting System), a full-blown media machinery for former president Ferdinand E. Marcos, and one of four TV stations in operation back then. Surprising, though, as Marcos banned Voltes V, MBS carried Daimos.

On February 24, 1986, during a live news conference in Malacañang, rebel forces tried to capture MBS and eventually succeeded. At the heat of exchanges between Marcos and then Chief of Staff General Fabian Ver, MBS suddenly went off the air when its facilities were taken over by rebel forces and by that afternoon started broadcasting for the people with its massive marathon coverage. Once the government then attempted not to broadcast the situation made by the rebels, only to fail.

During the administration of President Corazon Aquino, it became known as People's Television Network (PTV). The years following its broadcast, PTV's facilities, then housed on a major part of ABS-CBN's present studio complex in Bohol (now Sgt. Esguerra) Avenue, Quezon City, became a subject of a legal battle between the Lopezes and the Government.

To end the scuffle, the Aquino government, through the Bureau of Broadcast Services, which then newly revived the pre-Martial Law era Philippine Broadcasting Service, decided to expand the former National Media Production Center building in Visayas Ave. to eventually accommodate PTV. On January 22, 1992, the station moved its studios to the said complex with transmitters and other equipment largely donated from a grant of the French government. The Broadcast Center on the other hand, had been given back to ABS-CBN, who regained total control over the facility.

On July 16, 2001, PTV was renamed as National Broadcasting Network (NBN). By that time it introduced the country's first two-hour newscast Teledyaryo, and adopted mostly programs that showcase the programs of the Arroyo administration.

As President Benigno Aquino III entered office in June 2010, once again, NBN became part of PTNI to enhance its news and programing to viewers nationwide and worldwide until recently, NBN introduced its digital broadcast on ISDB-T channel 48 as the transmitter was rehabilitated and upgraded its frequency using advanced transmitter equipment from Harris Corporation of the United States.

In his second State of the Nation Address last July 25, 2011, Aquino called the government to make plans in re-strengthening PTV as a Government broadcaster.

On October 6, 2011, NBN reverted to the original People's Television Network (PTV) and followed by on July 2, 2012, PTV was rebranded as new slogan "Telebisyon ng Bayan (People's Television)".

As President Rodrigo Duterte entered office on July 1, 2016, the "Telebisyon ng Bayan" slogan was dropped from the logo, retaining its 2012 PTV logo on July 11, 2016, and followed by on November 25, 2016, it was officially announced that PTV was under the new manangement, the network named former TV5 Production Engineering head Dino Apolonio was appointed as the Network General Manager and he also assumed as the Network Chief Operating Officer replacing Albert Bocobo (who tendered his courtesy resignation to President Duterte through Presidential Communications Office secretary Martin Andanar on July 7, 2016.), and also the network's board member Josemaria Claro was also appointed as Network Vice Chairperson.

On January 4, 2017, PCOO Secretary Martin Andanar announced that PTV's transmitter power output was increased from 25 kW to 60 kW for a clearer and better signal reception.

On April 3, 2017, PTV launched its transitional and wordmark logo, its corresponding station ID, and new graphics, Finally, its official logo, which represents the elements of the Philippine flag, was launched upon the station's sign-on on June 28, 2017. The network also launched its new slogan, "Para sa Bayan (For the Nation)", which was already used since July 2016 (prior to the re-branding).

Digital television

Digital channels

DWGT-TV broadcasts its digital signal on UHF Channel 14 (473.143 MHz) and is multiplexed into the following subchannels:

Prior to its current DTT channel frequency, PTV was previously using the UHF Channel 48 frequency (677.143 MHz; now being used by Christian Era Broadcasting Service International to broadcast Iglesia ni Cristo Television (INCTV) on analog TV) from its beginning of digital test transmission until the first half of 2015, while TV5 (through its affiliate Nation Broadcasting Corporation) was using UHF Channel 42 before it discontinued. Later on September 7, 2015, PTV moved to UHF Channel 42 frequency (641.143 MHz) until July 15, 2021.

NTC released implementing rules and regulations on the re-allocation of the UHF Channels 14-20 (470–512 Megahertz (MHz) band) for digital terrestrial television broadcasting (DTTB) service. All operating and duly authorized Mega Manila VHF (very high frequency) television networks are entitled to a channel assignment from Channels 14 to 20.
On July 16, 2021, PTV began to transmit its digital test broadcast on UHF Channel 14 (473.143 MHz) as its permanent frequency assigned by NTC.

President Rodrigo Duterte on his first State of the Nation Address on July 25, 2016, stated that the government will put up two government-run TV channels for the Muslims and the Lumad, hence Salaam TV was established, while the channel for the Lumad is still being planned.

In addition, the government's official news agency (PNA) is planning to launch its own dedicated news channel on PTV's digital subchannel. Eventually, it launched a late-night newscast called PNA Newsroom airing every midnight on PTV.

PTV SD1
Presidential Communications Operations Office began broadcasting its own state owned channel, the OPS TV, in mid-2018. The subchannel features archived and Prior to its standalone channel launch.

Areas of coverage

Primary areas 
 Metro Manila 
 Cavite
 Bulacan
 Laguna
 Rizal

Secondary areas 
 Pampanga
 Portion of Tarlac
 Portion of Zambales
 Portion of Bataan
 Portion of Nueva Ecija
 Portion of Batangas
 Portion of Quezon

See also
People's Television Network
List of People's Television Network stations and channels
Philippine Broadcasting Service
Radyo Pilipinas 1 738
Radyo Pilipinas Dos 918

References

Para sa Bayan: Ang Kwento ng PTV [Documentary] (2017). Philippines: People's Television Network

Television stations in Metro Manila
People's Television Network stations
People's Television Network
Television channels and stations established in 1974
Digital television stations in the Philippines